Ivana Petrova (Bulgarian: Ивана Петрова; born ) is a Bulgarian weightlifter, most recently competing in the 45 kg division at the 2021 European Weightlifting Championships.

Career
She won the silver medal at the 2019 European Weightlifting Championships and  2021 European Weightlifting Championships in the 45 kg division.

Major results

References

External links
 

Living people
2001 births
Bulgarian female weightlifters
European Weightlifting Championships medalists
21st-century Bulgarian women